Gastrodia procera, commonly known as the tall potato orchid, is a leafless terrestrial mycotrophic orchid in the family Orchidaceae. It has a robust, dark brown to blackish flowering stem with up to seventy cinnamon brown, tube-shaped flowers that are white inside. It grows in high rainfall forest in southeastern Australia.

Description 
The petals have wavy edges. Flowering occurs from December to January and flowering is enhanced by fire the previous summer.

Taxonomy and naming
Gastrodia procera was first formally described in 1991 by Geoffrey William Carr from a specimen collected in the Dandenong Ranges near Albany in 1958. The description was published in the Indigenous Flora and Fauna Association Miscellaneous Paper. The specific epithet (procera) is a Latin word meaning "tall", "slender" or "long".

Distribution and habitat
The tall potato orchid is widespread and common in high rainfall forest south from the Barrington Tops in New South Wales, through the Australian Capital Territory and southeastern Victoria to Tasmania.

References 

procera
Plants described in 1991
Terrestrial orchids
Orchids of Western Australia